is a passenger railway station in the city of Naka, Ibaraki, Japan operated by East Japan Railway Company (JR East).

Lines
Shizu Station is served by the Suigun Line, and is located 18.1 rail kilometers from the official starting point of the line at Mito Station.

Station layout
The station consists of a single side platform serving traffic in both directions. The station originally had two opposed side platforms, and the ruins of the second platform are still in situ. There is no station building.  The station is unattended.

History
Shizu Station opened on February 1, 1919 as a station on the Mito Railway which was nationalized on December 1, 1927. The station was absorbed into the JR East network upon the privatization of the Japanese National Railways (JNR) on April 1, 1987.

Surrounding area

Shizu Jinja

See also
List of railway stations in Japan

External links 

  JR East Station information 

Railway stations in Ibaraki Prefecture
Suigun Line
Railway stations in Japan opened in 1919
Naka, Ibaraki